Shattered Dreams of Revolution: From Liberty to Violence in the Late Ottoman Empire is a 2014 book by Bedross Der Matossian, published by Stanford University Press. It discusses the Young Turk Revolution of 1908 and related aspects and contains six chapters.

References

Further reading
 
  - Published on 30 January 2018
  - Published on 3 October 2016.

External links
 Shattered Dreams of Revolution
 

2014 non-fiction books
Books about the Ottoman Empire
Stanford University Press books